James Ricalton (May 13, 1844 in Half Way, near Waddington, New York - died in Waddington October 28, 1929) was an American school teacher, traveler, inventor, and photographer. Ricalton travelled extensively and he circumnavigated the world seven times.

Maplewood
After briefly attending St. Lawrence University (class of 1871) Ricalton left before taking a degree and moved to Maplewood, New Jersey in 1871 for a 12-week, $200 contract as a school teacher. Contrary to practice at the time, his contract was renewed repeatedly until he became the district's first permanent school teacher and eventually principal. His legacy is celebrated in the South Orange-Maplewood School District.

Ricalton was locally famous for his habit of conducting classes outdoors in good weather and for his gentle manner. Among other things, a central square in Maplewood village is named after him, and there is a large mural of his outdoor classes in Maplewood municipal hall.

He expanded his house on Valley Street in Maplewood to house his enormous collection. When the township of Maplewood declined to accept his collection as a gift, he moved it all in two and a half train cars to his birth town of Waddington, where he spent his last five years.

Traveler

By profession a school teacher, Ricalton's passion was travel photography. Every summer, while on vacation from his school, he embarked on journeys overseas using a wheelbarrow-like cart large enough to transport his photography equipment by day, and to sleep in by night. It was designed such that during rainy weather Ricalton could stand in a well in the middle and continue walking under the cart's cover. Using this system, he visited Iceland, the Amazon and the St. Petersburg region of Russia, bringing back thousands of photographs, mineral specimens, and curios. His voyages came to the attention of local inventor Thomas A. Edison, who financed an expedition to search the Far East for a bamboo filament suitable for use in the incandescent lamp. Ricalton took a one-year leave of absence from teaching, and departed the United States in February 1888, arriving in Ceylon on April 1, via the Suez Canal.

Ricalton visited every part of the island, testing hundreds of samples, and continuing on to  British India, Singapore, China and Japan, becoming an expert in the properties of various types of bamboo. He returned home one year after his departure, with hundreds of samples for Edison, and recommendations on the two most suitable. This filament was used by Edison for nine months until the suitability of tungsten was discovered.

Photographer
Ricalton was a prolific photographer, leaving over 100,000 images, among them a large collection of stereoscopic images. He quit his teaching job in 1891 to become a professional photographer and war correspondent. For the next 15 years he photographed and recorded events such the Spanish–American War (1898–1899) in the Philippines, during the Boxer Rebellion (1900) in China, and the Russo-Japanese War (1904–1905) in Manchuria. When Ricalton tried to take pictures of Japanese soldiers in trenches during the Port Arthur campaign, he was held in custody until Major Yamaoka of General Nogi's staff confirmed that the American photographer could take pictures of whatever he wanted.

He was amongst the  photographers who recorded the 1903 Delhi Durbar which celebrated the installation of Edward VII as Emperor of India.

Ricalton's photographs earned him numerous honors and many were used to illustrate textbooks. He sold his images to the American Museum of Natural History and the Metropolitan Museum of Art in New York.  Many of his photographs were used by the Underwood & Underwood to illustrate geography books.

In 1909, at age 65, he walked from Cape Town to Cairo, a distance of 4,500 miles averaging 30 miles a day.  An extant diary confirms his daily itinerary through South Africa, Rhodesia, and Kenya.

In 1912, Ricalton was sent on another assignment by Edison to test a motion picture camera in Africa, filming among other things a whaling expedition off Cape Town. His son Lomond accompanied him on this trip but died from typhoid fever there, and this was Ricalton's last trip.

Ricalton retired to his home town of Waddington, New York, where he died October 28, 1929, at the age of 85.

Selected works
 1891 --  The City of the Sacred Bo-tree. (Anuradhapura). New York. 
 1900 --  India through the Stereoscope: A Journey through Hindustan.  New York: Underwood & Underwood. OCLC 2954773
 1901 --  China Through the Stereoscope: A Journey Through the Dragon Empire at the Time of the Boxer Uprising.  New York: Underwood & Underwood. 
 1902 --  The Boxer Uprising, Cheefoo Taku, Tien-Tsin: A Part of Underwood & Underwood's Stereoscopic Tour through China.  New York: Underwood & Underwood. 
 1905 --  A photographic record of the Russo-Japanese war, James H. Hare, editor. New York, P.F. Collier & Son. 
 1907 -- India through the Stereoscope: A Journey through Hindustan.  New York: Underwood & Underwood. 
 1910 -- India through the Stereoscope: A Journey through Hindustan.  New York: Underwood & Underwood. OCLC 21566682
 1990 --  James Ricalton's Photographic Travelogue of Imperial India, Christopher J. Lucas, editor. New York: Mellen. ;  OCLC 22345020
 2008 -- 美国摄影师的中国照片日记] (Meiguo she ying shi de Zhongguo zhao pian ri ji), Guangyu Xu, editor. Fuzou: 福建教育出版社 (Fujian jiao yu chu ban she''). ;

Notes

References
 Dyer, Frank Lewis and Thomas Commerford Martin. (1910)  Edison, His Life and Inventions. New York: Harper Brothers. 
 Ricalton, James. (1901).  China Through the Stereoscope: A Journey Through the Dragon Empire at the Time of the Boxer Uprising. New York: Underwood & Underwood. OCLC 5871769

External links

 Ricalton.org, a web site maintained by Ricalton's great-grandson, James Ricalton Wilson.
 Tribute page from Maplewood

American photographers
1844 births
1929 deaths
People from Maplewood, New Jersey
War correspondents of the Russo-Japanese War
American war correspondents
Order of the Precious Crown members
People from Waddington, New York
Schoolteachers from New Jersey